Pavoni is a surname. Notable people with the surname include:

 José Luis Pavoni (born 1954), Argentine football coach
 Matías Pavoni (born 1980), Argentine footballer
 Pierfrancesco Pavoni, Italian athlete
 Pier Ludovico Pavoni, Italian cinematographer, director, producer, and screenwriter
 Ricardo Pavoni (born 1943), Uruguayan footballer